Hakea kippistiana is a shrub in the family Proteacea and endemic to Western Australia. It is a dense prickly shrub with sharp needle-shaped leaves with fragrant white, cream or pink flowers from November to February.

Description
The branchlets are covered in white and rust coloured flattened hairs but quickly become smooth except at the leaf base. Flowering occurs from November to February and the flowers are strongly fragrant, white, cream or pink and arranged in groups of between 8 and 26. The rachis has thickly matted hairs or more or less raised short silky rusty coloured hairs, occasionally white hairs. The light brown to grey-yellow seeds have a single wing down one side.

Taxonomy and naming
The species was first formally described by the botanist Carl Meissner in 1855 in New Proteaceae of Australia as part of William Jackson Hooker's work Hooker's Journal of Botany and Kew Garden Miscellany.
The specific epithet honours Richard Kippist, who was once the librarian of the Linnean Society and was particularly interested in Australian plants.

Distribution and habitat
Hakea kippistiana is endemic to many scattered areas in the Wheatbelt and Goldfields-Esperance regions of Western Australia where it grows in red sandy soils around laterite.

References

kippistiana
Eudicots of Western Australia
Plants described in 1855
Taxa named by Carl Meissner